The Headies Award for Next Rated is an award presented at The Headies, a ceremony that was established in 2006 and originally called the Hip Hop World Awards. It was first presented to Aṣa in 2006. In addition to receiving the award plaque, recipients of the Next Rated honor are given a gifted with SUVs at a later date.

In 2022, The Headies announced that the Next Rated category will henceforth receive a brand new 2022 Bentley Bentayga, valued at over N300 million, instead of the SUVs Bnxn won the 2022 next rated award.

Recipients

Notes

References

The Headies